Dracophyllum oceanicum  is a species of flowering plant in the family Ericaceae. It is endemic to New South Wales.

References

oceanicum
Ericales of Australia
Flora of New South Wales
Plants described in 1999